Albany Creek State High School is a state secondary school located approximately  north of Brisbane in the suburb of Albany Creek. It was opened on 15 January 1982. The school, occupying 15.9 hectares, is situated on the corner of Old Northern Road and Albany Forest Drive. The school is located in the Albany Creek / Albany Forest district of Moreton Bay Region. The school has four houses for sporting events; Apollo, Hercules, Pegasus and Vulcan.

As at 7 February 2020, the school had an enrolment of 1,479 students.

See also 
Lists of schools in Queensland
Education in Australia

References

Public high schools in Brisbane